Couto Santa Cristina is a former civil parish in the municipality of Santo Tirso, Portugal. In 2013, the parish merged into the new parish Santo Tirso, Couto (Santa Cristina e São Miguel) e Burgães. It is located south in the city of Santo Tirso. At the 2001 census, its population was 3,982. It covers 7.8 km² of area.

The area is also home to several industrial commercial facilities.

Amigiscm (Associação Amigos de Santa Cristina) is based there.

References

External links
 Associação Amigos de Santa Cristina - English version

Former parishes of Santo Tirso